Sumo was one of the invitational sports at the 2001 World Games in Akita and was played between 25 and 26 August. 66 athletes, from 14 nations, participated in the tournament. The sumo competition took place at Tenno Town Gymnasium.

Participating nations

Medal table

Events

Men's events

Women's events

References

External links
 International Sumo Federation
 Sumo on IWGA website
 Results

 
2001 World Games
2001
Katagami, Akita